Grace Gill-McGrath (born 27 June 1989) is a retired Australian soccer player, who played for Canberra United in the Australian W-League and for Slovácko in the Czech Women's First League. Gill now works as a pundit & expert commentator in broadcast coverage of the A-League Women.  Gill has also begun her professional transition to main commentary (play-by-play) by calling the Western United vs Brisbane Roar Women's A-League match for Paramount+ (Australia) on 21 January 2023.

Playing career

Club career

Canberra United
Gill retired ahead of the 2016–17 W-League season.

Slovácko
In April 2013, Gill joined Slovácko.

International career
Gill played one match for Australia in 2007, in an 8–1 defeat of Hong Kong.

Post-playing career
In 2019, Gill was elected to the board of Capital Football.

References

External links 
Grace's Twitter

1989 births
Living people
Australian women's soccer players
Expatriate women's footballers in the Czech Republic
Canberra United FC players
1. FC Slovácko (women) players
A-League Women players
Women's association football midfielders
Sportspeople from Darwin, Northern Territory
Australian expatriate sportspeople in the Czech Republic
Czech Women's First League players
Sportswomen from the Northern Territory
Australian expatriate women's soccer players
Australian soccer commentators